The law of Romania is civil law.

History
The Romanian judicial system experienced a major overhaul in the early 2010s, with the introduction of four new codes: the Civil Code (2011), the Civil Procedure Code (2013) and the Penal and Penal Procedure Codes (2014).

Constitution
The basic law of Romania is the Constitution, which was adopted in December 1991 and revised in October 2003.

Legislation

Legislation includes laws and decrees.

Laws

Law No 28 of 28 December 1967
Law No 71 of 29 December 1969
Law No 22 of 28 November 1981
Law No 3 of 12 November 1982

Courts and judiciary

There is a Constitutional Court of Romania and a High Court of Cassation and Justice.

Legal practitioners

There is a National Union of Bar Associations of Romania (Romanian: Uniunea Națională a Barourilor din România) and a Bar Council. There was a Lawyers Union.

Criminal law

Criminal law in Romania is centered on the Penal Code of Romania, which came into force on 1 February 2014.

Private law
The current Civil Code of Romania came into force on 1 October 2011, replacing the old Civil Code of 1864, the Commercial Code of 1887 and the Family Code of 1953. The previous civil code came into force on 1 December 1865, and was amended numerous times over the years. It was re-published, in its amended form, in 1993 under the title Codul Civil.

For civil procedure, see the Civil procedure code of Romania.

See also
Law enforcement in Romania

References
Pries, Anne. In Winterton and Moys (eds). Information Sources in Law. Second Edition. Bowker-Saur. 1997. Chapter Twenty-Three: Romania. Pages 401 to 413.
Virgiliu Stoicoiu. Legal Sources and Bibliography of Romania. Free Europe Committee. 1964. Google Books
Levasseur, Trahan and Gruning. The Legal System of Romania. Carolina Academic Press. 2020. Google Books
Digest of General Laws of Romania. Google Books
Romanian legislation. Google Books
P Gogeanu and L P Marcu. A Concise History of Romanian Law. Scientific and Encyclopaedic Publishing House. Bucharest. 1981.
Istoria dreptului românesc. [History of Romanian Law]. Google Books
H B Jacobini. Romanian Public Law: Some Leading Internal Aspects. East European Monographs. 1987. Google Books
Irina Moroianu Zlatescu. Constitutional Law in Romania. Kluwer Law International. First Edition. 2012. Second Edition. 2017.
The New Communist Electoral Law in Romania. National Committee for a Free Europe. 1953. Google Books.
Catalin-Gabriel Stanescu and Bogdan Timofti. Commercial and Economic Law in Romania. Kluwer Law International. 2013. Google Books
Maria Bugeanu, Mihaela Tudor and Florentina Almajanu. Insurance Law in Romania. Kluwer Law International. 2012. Google Books
Georgeta Dinu, Adelina Roman, Marius Ștefana and Radu Tufescu. Competition Law in Romania. Kluwer Law International. First Edition. 2013. Second Edition. 2015.
Leaua and Baias. Arbitration in Romania: A Practitioner's Guide. Kluwer Law International. 2016.
Raluca Dimitriu. Romanian Industrial Relations Law. Intersentia. 2007. Google Books
Catalin Gabriel Stanescu. Energy Law in Romania. Kluwer Law International. First Edition. 2015. Second Edition.  2018.
Strenc, Gheorghiu and Bucsa. Intellectual Property Law in Romania. Kluwer Law International. First Edition. 2012. Second Edition. 2016. Third Edition. 2020.
Romania: An Analysis of Media Law and Practice. Article 19. 1997. Google Books.

External links
Guide to Law Online - Romania from Library of Congress

Law of Romania